Whampoa West is one of the 25 constituencies of the Kowloon City District Council. The seat elects one member of the council every four years. The seat has currently been held by independent Kwong Po-yin. The boundary is loosely based on the Western area of Whampoa Garden.

Councillors represented

Election results

2010s

2000s

1990s

Notes

References

Sources
2011 District Council Election Results (Kowloon City)
2007 District Council Election Results (Kowloon City)
2003 District Council Election Results (Kowloon City)
1999 District Council Election Results (Kowloon City)

Constituencies of Hong Kong
Constituencies of Kowloon City District Council
1994 establishments in Hong Kong
Constituencies established in 1994
Hung Hom